is a private university in Nantan, Kyoto, Japan. The predecessor of the school was founded in 1925. It was chartered as a junior college in 1978 and became a four-year college in 1983. The present name of the school was adopted in 2008.

External links
 Official website

Educational institutions established in 1925
Private universities and colleges in Japan
Universities and colleges in Kyoto Prefecture
1925 establishments in Japan